Barhoum is one of the municipalities the mandate of M'sila (Algeria), located east of the state, bounded on the east Magra based in the west Municipality Awlad Uday and south Municipality of Ain Khadra, known around the country to sell the meat of sheep, goats and chickens and also features the so-called trade in scrap, with a population of more than 20000.

Communes of M'Sila Province

ar:برهوم